{{Infobox horseraces
|class         = Group 3
|horse race    = Atalanta Stakes
|image         = 
|caption       = 
|location      = Sandown ParkEsher, England
|inaugurated   =
|race type     = Flat / Thoroughbred
|sponsor       = Betway
|website       = Sandown Park
|distance      = 1m (1,609 metres)
|surface       = Turf
|track         = Right-handed
|qualification = Three-years-old and upfillies and mares<small>no G2 / G1 win since last Sept. 1</small>
|weight        = 8 st 10 lb (3yo);9 st 1 lb (4yo+)Penalties7 lb for Group 1 winners *5 lb for Group 2 winners *3 lb for Group 3 winners ** after 31 March 2018
|purse         = £80,000 (2021)1st: £45,368
}}

|}

The Atalanta Stakes is a Group 3 flat horse race in Great Britain open to fillies and mares aged three years or older. It is run at Sandown Park over a distance of 1 mile (1,609 metres), and it is scheduled to take place each year in late August or early September.

The race was formerly classed at Listed level. It was promoted to Group 3 status in 2012.

The Atalanta Stakes was formerly part of the venue's Variety Club Day, an annual fundraising event for the Variety Club.

Records
Most successful horse since 1986:
 no horse has won this race more than once since 1986

Leading jockey since 1986 (4 wins):
 Pat Eddery – Tahilla (1987), Hyabella (1991), Private Line (1995), One So Wonderful (1997)

Leading trainer since 1986 (6 wins):
 Sir Michael Stoute – Dabaweyaa (1988), Hyabella (1991), Wasseema (2006), Strawberrydaiquiri (2009), Dank (2012), Veracious (2018)

Winners since 1986

See also
 Horse racing in Great Britain
 List of British flat horse races

References

 Racing Post:
 horseracingintfed.com – International Federation of Horseracing Authorities – Atalanta Stakes (2018).''

Flat races in Great Britain
Sandown Park Racecourse
Mile category horse races for fillies and mares